JQM may refer to:

 Jamote Qaumi Movement
 JQuery Mobile — a javascript framework for mobile and desktop platforms